Rand is an unincorporated community, with a U.S. Post Office, established in 1881 in Jackson County, Colorado, United States.

Description
It is a ranching community at the southern end of North Park south of Walden consisting of several homes and businesses, a post office, and ranching facilities. The Rand post office has the ZIP code 80473. Some say the community was named after Charles Rand, a pioneer, while others believe it has the name of J. A. Rand, another pioneer. The post office in Rand was established in 1883.

Geography
Rand is located at  (40.454262,-106.179256).

See also

References

External links

Unincorporated communities in Jackson County, Colorado
Unincorporated communities in Colorado